Kévin Constant (born 10 May 1987) is a former professional footballer who played as a midfielder or left back. Having come through the Toulouse youth system, he left for LB Châteauroux in 2008. He moved to Italy in 2010 playing for Chievo, Genoa, and Milan. Following a stint at Trabzonspor in Turkey, he returned to Italy's Bologna in 2016 before joining FC Sion in Switzerland in 2017. In 2019, he was contracted to Iranian club Tractor but never played for the club. At international level, he made 24 appearances scoring 4 goals with the Guinea national team.

Club career

Toulouse
Constant progressed through the ranks of the reserves. In 2006, he was promoted to Toulouse's first-team squad.

Châteauroux
In 2008, Constant moved to Ligue 2 side LB Châteauroux.

Chievo
In September 2010, Constant was signed by Italian club Chievo on a loan deal, ultimately made permanent in June 2011.

Genoa
On 1 July 2011, Constant made a move to Genoa for €5.6 million cash, with Francesco Acerbi (tagged for €2 million) and Ivan Fatić (tagged for €200,000) moving the other way to Chievo. Genoa, however, bought Acerbi outright from Reggina for €2.2 million, which would make Constant worth €8 million.

Milan

On 20 June 2012, Constant moved to Milan on a loan deal, which carried an option to buy. On 26 January 2013, Milan entered into co-ownership with Genoa for Constant in exchange for the termination of Francesco Acerbi's co-ownership, both for €4 million fees. On 27 July 2013, Milan purchased Constant outright for another €6 million, also selling Rodney Strasser to Genoa for €3.5 million on the same day.

In July 2013, Constant responded to what he perceived as racial abuse from spectators at a pre-season TIM Trophy match against Sassuolo by leaving the pitch. Although the Italian Football Federation (FIGC) fined Sassuolo €30,000 due to "racially discriminatory shouts and chants aimed at a player from the opposition’s team", a police investigation found no evidence of such.

Trabzonspor
Constant transferred to Turkish Süper Lig club Trabzonspor for a €2.5 million transfer fee in 2014, signing a four-year contract worth an annual average of €2.25 million. He made his official debut for the club against Russian side Rostov in the play-off qualifying round for the 2014–15 UEFA Europa League. Constant's contract was later terminated on 18 November 2015 for €2 million.

Bologna
On 1 February 2016, Constant returned to Italy after signing with Bologna on a -year deal.

Tractor
On 4 January 2019, Constant signed a 3.5-year contract with Tractor of the Persian Gulf Pro League. In June, Constant's contract was terminated after he failed a medical test at the club.

Retirement
In January 2020, Constant announced his retirement as a player at the age of 32 citing "personal reasons".

International career
Constant began representing the French under-17 squad in 2004.

Qualified to play for the Guinea senior team through his mother he made his debut on 14 October 2007, in a 1–3 friendly loss against Senegal. On 10 October 2010, Constant scored his second goal in a 2012 Africa Cup of Nations qualification against Nigeria.

Career statistics

Club

Notes

International

Scores and results list Guinea's goal tally first, score column indicates score after each Constant goal.

Honours
France U17
 UEFA European Under-17 Championship: 2004

References

External links

1987 births
Living people
Sportspeople from Fréjus
Association football fullbacks
Association football midfielders
Citizens of Guinea through descent
Guinean footballers
French sportspeople of Guinean descent
French people of Guadeloupean descent
French footballers
Guinea international footballers
Guinean expatriate footballers
Guinean expatriate sportspeople in France
Guinean expatriate sportspeople in Italy
Guinean expatriate sportspeople in Turkey
Guinean expatriate sportspeople in Switzerland
Expatriate footballers in France
Expatriate footballers in Italy
Expatriate footballers in Turkey
Expatriate footballers in Switzerland
Expatriate footballers in Iran
Ligue 1 players
Ligue 2 players
Serie A players
Süper Lig players
Swiss Super League players
Toulouse FC players
LB Châteauroux players
A.C. ChievoVerona players
Genoa C.F.C. players
A.C. Milan players
Trabzonspor footballers
Bologna F.C. 1909 players
FC Sion players
Tractor S.C. players
France youth international footballers
2015 Africa Cup of Nations players
Footballers from Provence-Alpes-Côte d'Azur
Black French sportspeople